Erik P. Kimball is a United States bankruptcy judge in the West Palm Beach Division of the Southern District of Florida.  He was appointed to the 14-year term in June 2008.

Biography
A 1983 graduate of Hopedale High School, Kimball earned a Juris Doctor from Boston College Law School in 1990 and a B.A. from the University of Massachusetts Amherst in 1987.

Career
He started his legal practice at Hale and Dorr in the Boston office of the Commercial Law and Bankruptcy Department.  He left to become a vice president at Colonial Management Associates, Inc.

References

21st-century American judges
Boston College Law School alumni
University of Massachusetts Amherst alumni
Living people
Year of birth missing (living people)
People from Hopedale, Massachusetts
Lawyers from Boston
Wilmer Cutler Pickering Hale and Dorr people
Judges of the United States bankruptcy courts